Mark Robert Napier (born January 28, 1957) is a Canadian former professional ice hockey player who played over a thousand professional games between the National Hockey League and World Hockey Association. He was a two-time Stanley Cup winner in the NHL.

Biography
As a youth, Napier played in the 1968 and 1969 Quebec International Pee-Wee Hockey Tournaments with minor ice hockey teams from Toronto.

An alumnus of the Toronto Marlboros organization, Napier turned pro as a teenager for the Toronto Toros of the WHA and also played for the Birmingham Bulls. After the WHA folded, Napier joined the Montreal Canadiens, winning the Stanley Cup with them in 1979. He also played for the Minnesota North Stars before joining the Edmonton Oilers, winning his second Cup with them in 1985. In 1987, he was traded again, and would finish his career in North America in a Buffalo Sabres uniform before playing three seasons in Italy.

In 1997, Napier was hired as the head coach of the Toronto St. Michael's Majors of the Ontario Hockey League. He was the president of the NHL Alumni Association for 12 years and retired in 2016.

Awards and achievements
1974–75 - Jim Mahon Memorial Trophy
1975 - Memorial Cup (Toronto)
1975–76 - WHA - Lou Kaplan Trophy (Rookie of the Year) (Toronto)
1978–79 - NHL - Stanley Cup (Montreal)
1982 - Team Canada - Bronze medal
1985 - NHL - Stanley Cup (Edmonton)

Career statistics

Regular season and playoffs

International

References

External links

1957 births
Living people
Birmingham Bulls players
Bolzano HC players
Buffalo Sabres players
Canadian expatriate ice hockey players in Italy
Canadian ice hockey coaches
Canadian ice hockey forwards
Canadian radio sportscasters
Edmonton Oilers players
HC Varese players
Minnesota North Stars players
Montreal Canadiens draft picks
Montreal Canadiens players
National Hockey League first-round draft picks
Serie A (ice hockey) players
Sportspeople from North York
Ice hockey people from Toronto
Stanley Cup champions
Toronto Marlboros players
Toronto St. Michael's Majors coaches
Toronto Toros players